First is the first official recording by the metal band Baroness. The artwork was done by Baroness singer John Baizley.

Track listing
All songs written by Baroness, lyrics by John Baizley.

Personnel
 John Baizley - vocals/guitar
 Allen Blickle - drums
 Tim Loose - guitar
 Summer Welch - bass

References

External links
Vinyl Pressing Info and Pictures

2004 debut EPs
Baroness (band) EPs
Hyperrealist Records albums
Albums with cover art by John Dyer Baizley